Henry H. Gilmore (August 31, 1832 – December 24, 1891) was a Massachusetts businessman and politician who served on the Board of Selectmen of the Town of Medford, Massachusetts and as the Mayor of The City of  Cambridge, Massachusetts.

Early life
Gilmore was born in Warner, New Hampshire on August 31, 1832 to Mitchel and Czarina (Currier) Gilmore.  He married Sarah D. Todd in Charlestown, Massachusetts on May 19, 1858.

Public Offices
Gilmore served on various town and city offices in Medford, Massachusetts and Cambridge, Massachusetts.  In Medford, Massachusetts he was a member of the Board of Selectmen, Overseer of the Poor, Highway Surveyor and Assessor.  In Cambridge he was a member of the Common Council and Board of Aldermen. Gilmore also represented Cambridge and the Third Middlesex District in the Massachusetts State Senate.  In 1885 Gilmore was the Democratic party nominee for the office of Lieutenant Governor of Massachusetts

Notes

Mayors of Cambridge, Massachusetts
Cambridge, Massachusetts City Council members
Massachusetts state senators
1832 births
1891 deaths
19th-century American politicians
People from Warner, New Hampshire